Roar Christensen (born 29 April 1971) is a Norwegian football midfielder who currently is the playing head coach of Grovfjord IL.

He started his career in Grovfjord IL, and joined regional greats Tromsø IL ahead of the 1996 season. He made his debut in May 2006 and played his last game in November 2006, amassing 235 league games, most of them in the Norwegian Premier League.

In the 2008 season, Christensen was an assisting coach in Grovfjord IL. Ahead of the 2009 season he was promoted to head coach, doubling as an active player.

References

Norwegian footballers
Tromsø IL players
Norwegian football managers
People from Troms
1971 births
Living people
Association football midfielders
Sportspeople from Troms og Finnmark